Kochara is a village in Abkhazia region of Georgia. The 2011 census recorded a population of 277.

References

Populated places in Ochamchira District